Samuel Caruthers (October 13, 1820 – July 20, 1860) was a U.S. Representative from Missouri.

Born in Madison County, Missouri, Caruthers graduated from Cumberland University, Lebanon, Tennessee.
He studied law.
He was admitted to the bar and commenced practice in Fredericktown, Missouri.
He moved to Cape Girardeau, Missouri, in 1844.
Congressman Caruthers held several local offices prior to being elected to the U.S. Congress.

Caruthers was elected as a Whig to the Thirty-third Congress.
He was reelected as an Opposition Party candidate to the Thirty-fourth Congresses (March 4, 1853 – March 3, 1857).
Caruthers changed political party membership again and was reelected as a Democrat to the Thirty-fifth Congress (March 4, 1857 – March 3, 1859).
He died in Cape Girardeau, Missouri, July 20, 1860.

Caruthersville, Missouri, was named in his honor.

Notes

References

External links
 

1820 births
1860 deaths
People from Madison County, Missouri
Missouri Whigs
Whig Party members of the United States House of Representatives
Opposition Party members of the United States House of Representatives from Missouri
Missouri Oppositionists
Democratic Party members of the United States House of Representatives from Missouri
People from Cape Girardeau, Missouri
Cumberland University alumni
19th-century American politicians